Pittosporum wingii, sometimes known as the mountain pittosporum or hairy pittosporum, is a shrub or small tree growing in tropical Queensland in Australia. It may reach 9 metres tall, growing in rainforest or moist eucalyptus areas. It grows in a variety of different sites, including forest understory from 150 metres to 1100 metres above sea level

References 

Apiales of Australia
Flora of Queensland
wingii
Taxa named by Ferdinand von Mueller